The Ubudiah Mosque is a small mosque located in the royal town of Kuala Kangsar, Perak, Malaysia.

History
The mosque is located beside the Royal Mausoleum on Jalan Istana at Bukit Chandan in Kuala Kangsar. 
The mosque was designed by Arthur Benison Hubback, who was also responsible for the design of the Ipoh railway station and the Kuala Lumpur railway station.

The mosque was built during the reign of the 28th Sultan of Perak, Sultan Idris Murshidul Adzam Shah I Ibni Almarhum Raja Bendahara Alang Iskandar Teja, who commissioned its construction as thanksgiving for his recovery from an illness that plagued him in his later years. The groundbreaking ceremony took place on 26 September 1913.

The construction of the mosque was interrupted several times, once when two elephants belonging to the sultan and Raja Chulan fought, ran over and damaged the Italian marble tiles. The outbreak of the first world war also affected its construction.

The mosque was finally completed in late 1917 at a total cost of $24,000 or RM200,000 – a considerable sum at that time. It was officially declared open by Sultan Abdul Jalil Karamtullah Shah Ibni Almarhum Sultan Idris Murshidul Adzam Shah I Rahmatullah, successor to Sultan Idris who had died during its construction. The mosque is now a symbol of pride for the people of the state of Perak.'''

The mosque was renovated in 2003.

Features
Its architecture is in the Indo-Saracenic style. It has a central golden dome, and four minarets as well as turrets topped with smaller golden domes. Italian marble was used to add bands of darker colour to the white building.  The Makam Al-Ghufran or Perak royal mausoleum is located near the mosque.

Gallery

See also
 Islam in Malaysia

References

Mosques in Perak
Mosques completed in 1917
1917 establishments in British Malaya
Kuala Kangsar District
Mosque buildings with domes